This is a list of current finance ministers of the 193 United Nations member states, Holy See (Vatican City) and the State of Palestine.

Finance ministers of sovereign countries with limited recognition are included in a separate table.

States recognised by the United Nations

States with limited recognition, non-UN member states

Excluded entities

See also 
Lists of office-holders

References 

finance